West Ealing railway station is on the Great Western Main Line in Ealing, situated in west London. Its three-letter station code is WEA.

History

The station was opened on 1 March 1871 as Castle Hill on the Great Western Railway, which was constructed from London Paddington through Ealing to Maidenhead in 1836–1838. The station was renamed Castle Hill Ealing Dean in 1875. This service was discontinued as uneconomic after 30 September 1885. On 1 July 1899, the station was renamed West Ealing.

Originally the station consisted of four platforms in a staggered layout: platform 1 (along with a siding) and the island comprising platforms 2 and 3 to the west of the Drayton Green Road bridge, and platform 4 on the east side. The station was located next to the London Co-operative Society's main creamery, and so was equipped with a dedicated milk train platform in the mid-1900s.

Platform 1 and its siding were demolished in the late 1960s; platform 4 was demolished and moved west of the bridge by early 1990, partially covering the site of the then long-closed milk depot; platform 2 was partially demolished and fenced off by early 1991 as trains on the main line no longer served the station. The remains of the milk train platform can still be seen today, next to platform 5.

From around 1985 to 1990, access to the original platform 4 was opposite the station building, across Drayton Green Road bridge. The previous station building (which is now closed) was completed in early 1987, following demolition of the previous century-old building a year earlier.

Since October 2008, Oyster "pay as you go" can be used for journeys originating or ending at West Ealing.

In December 2018, Chiltern Railways commenced operating a once per day parliamentary service on weekdays from South Ruislip and to High Wycombe via the Greenford line. It replaced a service to London Paddington via the Acton–Northolt line. It became once a week on Wednesdays only after the COVID-19 pandemic. It ran for the last time on 7 December 2022, when it was replaced by a bus service.

Crossrail 
West Ealing was first proposed to be part of the Crossrail project in the 1990s. In 2003, initial public consultation proposed that no Crossrail services would stop at the station. Following criticism, it was proposed that services would call at the station 7 days a week, with station improvements including a new ticket hall and step-free access. However, the Greenford branch line would terminate at the station at a new platform, to allow for a greater number of services to run into Paddington. In May 2011, Network Rail announced that it would deliver improvements and alterations to prepare the station for Crossrail services.

In 2015, the station design was approved by Ealing Council, allowing construction to commence. The work would include a new station building designed by Bennetts Associates with access from Manor Road, a new platform for the Greenford branch, platform extensions and step-free access to all platforms. Outside the station, public realm improvements funded by Transport for London and Ealing Borough Council would include a raised speed table with granite paving, widened pavements, street trees and cycle parking.

In September 2016, Great Western Railway began operating services from Paddington with Class 387 trains, which led to most Greenford services that had previously run to Paddington to terminate at West Ealing, using the newly built platform 5. In June 2017, it was announced that completion of the station was delayed until 2019. In December 2017, MTR Crossrail took over management of the station from Great Western Railway, with TfL Rail services running from May 2018, transferring to the Elizabeth line in May 2022. In 2019, contracts for the new station building was awarded, allowing construction of the new station building.

Following delays due to the COVID-19 pandemic, the new station building opened on 25 March 2021, providing step free access to all platforms. The existing station building on Drayton Green Road was permanently closed.

Accidents and incidents 

On 5 August 1989, an express passenger train travelling from Oxford to Paddington collided with a piece of rail left on the track, probably by vandals, and the locomotive, Class 50 50025 Invincible, was derailed along the points near to platform 2 (these points were removed by November of that year). There were no serious injuries.

Services
Services at West Ealing are operated by the Elizabeth line and Great Western Railway, with a very limited service operated by Chiltern Railways.

The typical off-peak service in trains per hour is:
 4 tph to 
 2 tph to 
 2 tph to 
 2 tph to 

A Sunday service was introduced at the station is May 2019. Prior to this, the station was closed on Sundays. The services to Greenford do not run on Sundays.

It last ran on 7 December 2022 with a bus to operate the service from the following week.

Connections
London Buses routes E7 and E11 serve the station.

References

External links

Railway stations in the London Borough of Ealing
DfT Category E stations
Railway stations in Great Britain opened in 1871
Former Great Western Railway stations
Railway stations served by Chiltern Railways
Railway stations served by the Elizabeth line
Railway stations served by Great Western Railway
1871 establishments in England